The Appaloosa is a horse breed known for its leopard-spotted coat markings and other distinctive physical characteristics.

Appaloosa may also refer to:
The Appaloosa, a 1966 Western film starring Marlon Brando
Appaloosa (novel), a 2005 novel by Robert B. Parker
Appaloosa (film), a 2008 Western film directed by and starring Ed Harris
Appaloosa (band), a French electronic duo
Appaloosa oil field, an offshore oil field
Appaloosa Interactive, a video game company
Appaloosa Management, an American hedge fund
Appaloosa bean, a type of bean
Appaloosa Music Festival, an annual roots music festival in Front Royal, VA

See also
Appalousa, an Amerindian tribe of Louisiana